Alexander McGowan (sometimes spelled "McGowen," 1817–1893) was a foundry owner, Mayor of Houston, Texas, and a Chief Justice of Harris County, Texas.

Early life
Alexander McGowan was born in Duplin County, North Carolina on July 5, 1817.  He was raised by foster parents and spent most of his youth in Montgomery, Alabama.  He came to  Houston in September 1839, opening a tin shop shortly after arriving.  He married Sarah Christopher in 1841, and together they had eight children.

Manufacturing
McGowan graduated from tinner to hardware manufacturer, and eventually established a foundry in Houston.  He sold his castings and hardware to people in various parts of Texas.  He made the castings that Gail Borden used in his machine for making condensed milk.  McGowan's foundry manufactured the boiler tubes for the first electrical power plant in Houston.

Political life
In 1845, McGowan was a delegate to the Constitutional Convention for prepare for the annexation of Texas to the United States.   He served as Chief Justice of Harris County.  He was Alderman for the City of Houston for several terms, and a Mayor of Houston for three terms.  He was Tax Assessor for Harris County, and served as Harris County Treasurer.

Death
McGowan died December 26, 1893.  He was buried at San Felipe, Texas.

References

1817 births
1893 deaths
Burials at Glenwood Cemetery (Houston, Texas)
Mayors of Houston
19th-century American politicians